Ryeland (NS 65545 40364) was a railway station on the Darvel and Strathaven Railway serving Caldermill and the surrounding rural area in South Lanarkshire, Scotland.

History

On 4 July 1905 the line opened, thereby connecting the Darvel Branch that ran from Kilmarnock, resulting in the line becoming a through route to Strathaven which was a line jointly run between the Glasgow and South Western Railway (G&SWR) and the Caledonian Railway (CR). The CR owned the Loudounhill to Strathaven section and the G&SWR owned the section from Loudounhill to Darvel and beyond

Despite being a through route, no trains ran between Kilmarnock and Strathaven; instead, the two companies took it in turns to run the line between Darvel and Strathaven every six months. Stations were also located at Drumclog and Loudounhill. The line was never successful and closed in 1939 and the track lifted in 1951.

The station had a signal box on the platform and a wooden waiting room and ticket office. The station had an island platform and steps from the overbridge gave passengers access. Several sidings with a large goods shed were present. Ryelands Creamery was located nearby. The goods shed and creamery building were still present in 2012.

The nominal junction between the Caledonian Railway and the Glasgow and South Western Railway was at the county boundary at Loudounhill Station. The closed line was used to store hundreds of damaged railway waggons that were awaiting repair.

The line had been intended as a through route between Lanarkshire and Ayrshire, however there was very little traffic along the route as the population in the area was very low. The station was closed from September until November 1909 and then again from January 1917 until December 1922. As stated, the last train ran on 10 September 1939, however the official closing date was two weeks later.

Other stations
 Strathaven
 Drumclog
 Loudounhill

References

Notes

Sources
 
 
 Sellar, W.S. & Stevenston, J. L. (1981). The Last Trains. (3) South-West Scotland. Edinburgh : Moorfoot Publishing. .
 Stansfield, Gordon (1997). Lanarkshire's Lost Railways. Ochiltree : Stenlake. .
 Stansfield, Gordon (1999). Ayrshire & Renfrewshire's Lost Railways. Ochiltree : Stenlake. .
 Thomas, John (1971). A Regional History of the Railways of Great Britain. V.6, Scotland. David & Charles : Newton Abbot. .

Previous and next stations 

Disused railway stations in South Lanarkshire
Former Caledonian Railway stations
Railway stations in Great Britain opened in 1905
Railway stations in Great Britain closed in 1909
Railway stations in Great Britain opened in 1909
Railway stations in Great Britain closed in 1917
Railway stations in Great Britain opened in 1922
Railway stations in Great Britain closed in 1939
1905 establishments in Scotland
1939 disestablishments in Scotland